The following lists events that happened during 1984 in New Zealand.

Population
 Estimated population as of 31 December: 3,293,000
 Increase since 31 December 1983: 28,200 (0.86%)
 Males per 100 Females: 98.3

Incumbents

Regal and viceregal
Head of State – Elizabeth II
Governor-General – The Hon Sir David Beattie GCMG GCVO QSO QC.

Government
The 40th New Zealand Parliament, led by the National Party, concluded, and in the general election the Labour Party was elected in the 41st New Zealand Parliament.

Speaker of the House – Richard Harrison then Basil Arthur
Prime Minister – Robert Muldoon then David Lange
Deputy Prime Minister – Duncan MacIntyre then Jim McLay then Geoffrey Palmer
Minister of Finance – Robert Muldoon then Roger Douglas
Minister of Foreign Affairs – Warren Cooper then David Lange
Chief Justice – Sir Ronald Davison

Parliamentary opposition
 Leader of the Opposition –  David Lange (Labour) until 26 July, then Robert Muldoon (National) until 29 November, then Jim McLay.
Social Credit Party – Bruce Beetham until 26 July, then not represented in Parliament.

Main centre leaders
Mayor of Auckland – Catherine Tizard
Mayor of Hamilton – Ross Jansen
Mayor of Wellington – Ian Lawrence
Mayor of Christchurch – Hamish Hay
Mayor of Dunedin – Cliff Skeggs

Events
 27 January – A state of emergency is declared in Southland as record rainfall causes flooding which forces the evacuation of 4000 people and leaves damage totalling $55 million.
 3–6 February – The fifth Sweetwaters Music Festival is held in Pukekawa, with the satellite Sweetwaters South held in Christchurch on 6 February.
 6 February – Te Hikoi ki Waitangi march disrupts Waitangi Day celebrations.
27 March – A suitcase bomb explodes at the Wellington Trades Hall, killing the caretaker, Ernie Abbott. No arrest has been made, see Terrorism in New Zealand.
24 June – New Zealand's first IVF-conceived baby, Amelia Bell, is born at Auckland's National Women's Hospital.
14 July – 1984 general election: The Labour Party, led by David Lange, wins 56 of the 95 seats in the House of Representatives. The Fourth Labour Government is formed, ending 9 years of National rule.
18 July – Government devalues New Zealand dollar by 20 percent. See New Zealand constitutional crisis, 1984.
 20 August – New Zealand reestablishes diplomatic relations with Argentina at a consular level.

Unknown dates
New Zealand signs the United Nations Convention on the Elimination of All Forms of Discrimination Against Women.
Auckland's population exceeds that of the South Island.

Arts and literature
Brian Turner wins the Robert Burns Fellowship.

See 1984 in art, 1984 in literature, :Category:1984 books

Music

New Zealand Music Awards
Winners are shown first with nominees underneath.
ALBUM OF THE YEAR  Dance Exponents – Prayers be Answered
The Mockers – Swear It's True
Patsy Riggir – You'll Never Take The Country Out of Me
SINGLE OF THE YEAR  The Narcs – You Took Me Heart and Soul
Pātea Māori Club and Dalvanius Prime – "Aku Raukura"
Dance Exponents – I'll Say Goodbye (Even Though I'm Blue)
TOP MALE VOCALIST  Jordan Luck (Dance Exponents)
Andy Dickson (The Narcs)
Andrew Fagan (The Mockers)
TOP FEMALE VOCALIST  Patsy Riggir
Jodi Vaughan
Suzanne Prentice
TOP GROUP  Dance Exponents
The Mockers
Pātea Māori Club and Dalvanius Prime
MOST PROMISING MALE VOCALIST  Martin Phillips (The Chills)
Ross McKenzie (The Idles)
Wayne Gillespie
MOST PROMISING FEMALE VOCALIST  Meryl Yvonne
Janice Lampen
Sharon Dubont
MOST PROMISING GROUP  The Chills
Jive Bombers
You're A Movie
BEST JAZZ ALBUM  Brian Smith Quartet – Southern Excursio
Ken Avery/ Darktown Strutters – Jazz The Way It Used to Be
Rodger Fox – Something Juicy
BEST COUNTRY ALBUM  Patsy Riggir – You'll Never Take the Country Out of Me
Suzanne Prentice – So Precious To Me
Jodi Vaughn – Rodeo Eyes
BEST CLASSICAL ALBUM  NZSO & Others – Music By Larry Pruden
Michael Houston – Michael Houston
Schola Musica – NZ Music For Strings
BEST POLYNESIAN ALBUM  Pātea Māori Club & Dalvanius Prime – "Aku Raukura"
The Five Stars – Musika Malie (Good Music)
Rosalio – Samoan Serenade
BEST FOLK ALBUM  Phil Garland – Springtime in the Mountains
Michael Warmuth – Hammered Duclimer
Wayne Gillespie – Wayward Son
PRODUCER OF THE YEAR  Dave MCartney – You Took Me Heart & Soul
Glyn Tucker Jnr / Trevor Reekie – Swear It's True
Glyn Tucker Jnr / Trevor Reekie – You Fascinate
ENGINEER OF THE YEAR  Graham Myhre – You Took Me Heart & Soul
Graham Myhre/ Gyn Tucker Jnr – Caught in the Act
Glyn Tucker Jnr – You Fascinate
BEST COVER DESIGN  Joe Wylie – Aku Raukura (Pātea Māori Club)
Murray Vincent – Music By Larry Purden
Mike Hutton – Vocal at the Local
BEST MUSIC VIDEO  Bruce Morrison – I'm in Heaven
William Keddell – Elephunk in My Soup
Tom Parkinson – I'll Say Goodbye (Even Though I'm Blue) (Dance Exponents)
BEST FILM SOUNDTRACK  Jenny Mcleod – The Silent One
Mike Nock – Strata
John Charles/ Dave Fraser – Constance
INTERNATIONAL ACHIEVEMENT  Tim Finn
Dragon
Split Enz
OUTSTANDING CONTRIBUTION TO THE MUSIC INDUSTRY  Eldred Stebbing – (For his Lifelong Contribution to the Recording Arts in New Zealand)
Jacqui Fitzgerald
Peter Blake & TVNZ
MOST POPULAR SONG  The Narcs – You Took Me Heart and Soul

See: 1984 in music

Performing arts

 Benny Award presented by the Variety Artists Club of New Zealand to John Maybury Senior.

Radio and television
See: 1984 in New Zealand television, 1984 in television, List of TVNZ television programming, :Category:Television in New Zealand, :Category:New Zealand television shows, Public broadcasting in New Zealand

Film
Came a Hot Friday
Constance
Other Halves
The Silent One
Vigil
The Bounty

See: :Category:1984 film awards, 1984 in film, List of New Zealand feature films, Cinema of New Zealand, :Category:1984 films

Sport

Athletics
 Barry Thompson wins his first national title in the men's marathon, clocking 2:19:03 on 25 March in Wanganui, while Mary Belsey does the same in the women's championship (2:41:39).

Basketball
 NBL won by Wellington.

Horse racing

Harness racing
 New Zealand Trotting Cup: Camelot
 Auckland Trotting Cup: Enterprise

Olympic Games

Summer Olympics

 New Zealand sends a team of 130 competitors across 18 sports.

Winter Olympics

 New Zealand sends a team of six alpine skiers.

Paralympic Games

Summer Paralympics

Winter Paralympics

 New Zealand sends a team of eight competitors in one sport.

Shooting
Ballinger Belt – Peter Cromwell (Cheltenham)

Soccer
 New Zealand National Soccer League won by Gisborne City
 The Chatham Cup is won by Manurewa who beat Gisborne City 2–1 in the final.

Births
 27 January: Vince Mellars, rugby league player.
 14 February: Jared Wrennall, musician.
 17 February: Timothy Gudsell, cyclist.
 21 February: Andy Ellis, rugby union player.
 25 February: Paul Vodanovich, soccer player.
 8 March: Ross Taylor, cricketer.
 16 March: Hosea Gear, rugby union player.
 25 March: Liam Messam, rugby union and rugby sevens player.
 2 April: Meryl Cassie, actor.
 6 April: Stacey Carr, field hockey player.
 20 April: Fraser Anderson, rugby league player.
 28 May: Beth Allen, actor.
 2 June: Jack Afamasaga, rugby league player.
 6 June: Antonia Prebble, actor.
 7 June: Jennyfer Jewell, actor.
 20 June: Jarrod Smith, soccer player.
 27 June: Emma Lahana, actor.
 28 June: Evarn Tuimavave, rugby league player.
 13 July: Gareth Williams, actor
 14 July: Fleur Saville, actor.
 6 August: Jesse Ryder, cricketer.
 12 September: Ben Townley, motocrosser.
 6 October: Valerie Adams, athlete, Olympic gold medallist (2008 Beijing and 2012 London)
 23 November: Jerome Ropati, rugby league player.
 14 December: Keshia Paulse, singer.
 Vicki Lin, television presenter.
:Category:1984 births

Deaths
 23 January: Dean Goffin, composer
 6 March: Ian Cromb, cricketer 
 20 March: Robin Tait, discus thrower
 28 April: Sylvia Ashton-Warner, writer and educator
 13 June: Ken Armstrong, soccer player
 15 June: Tom Heeney, boxer
 21 July: Adam Adamson, former mayor of Invercargill
 13 September: Lois White, painter
 26 November: Eliot V. Elliott, trade unionist
 9 December: Guthrie Wilson, novelist and teacher (in Sydney)

References

See also
List of years in New Zealand
Timeline of New Zealand history
History of New Zealand
Military history of New Zealand
Timeline of the New Zealand environment
Timeline of New Zealand's links with Antarctica

 
New Zealand
Years of the 20th century in New Zealand